Governor Noble may refer to:

Noah Noble (1794–1844), 5th Governor of Indiana
Patrick Noble (1787–1840), 57th Governor of South Carolina